The Hospital Authority is a statutory body managing all the government hospitals and institutes in Hong Kong. It is under the governance of its board and is under the monitor of the Secretary for Health of the Hong Kong Government. Its chairman is Henry Fan.

History
Before the establishment of the authority, all health and medical issues were under the management of the Medical and Health Department.  In 1990, a new health administration system was introduced as part of the 1989 reforms. The establishment of the Authority served to rebuild state capacity amid the emergence of party politics in Hong Kong. The department became the Department of Health and in 1991, the management of all the public hospitals was passed to a new statutory body, the Hospital Authority, which was established on 1 December 1990 under the Hospital Authority Ordinance. In 2003, the General Outpatient Clinics of Department of Health were transferred to the authority.

Hospital clusters

Hospital Authority has been providing services to the public under a cluster-based structure since 1993. It currently manages 43 public hospitals and institutions, 49 specialist outpatient clinics and 73 general outpatient clinics. As of 31 March 2019, it has a workforce of about 79,000 and some 28,000 beds. These facilities are organised into seven hospital clusters according to their geographical locations, as shown in the table below. Each hospital cluster comprises a mix of acute and convalescent or rehabilitation hospitals to provide a full range of healthcare services.

Corporate governance

Hospital Authority Board
According to the Hospital Authority Ordinance (Cap 113), the Chief Executive of Hong Kong appoints members of the Hospital Authority Board governing the authority. The present board consists of 27 members, including the chairman. Membership of the authority comprises 23 non-public officers, three public officers and the chief executive of the authority. Apart from the chief executive of the authority, other members are not remunerated in their capacity as board members.

Current and former chairmen
Sir Sze-yuen Chung, GBM, GBE, JP (1 December 1990 – 31 March 1995)
Peter Woo Kwong-ching, GBM, GBS, JP (1 April 1995 – 30 September 2000)
Lo Ka-shui, GBS, JP (1 October 2000 – 30 September 2002)
Edward Leong Che-hung, GBM, GBS, OBE, JP (1 October 2002 – 8 July 2004)
Anthony Wu Ting-yuk, GBS, JP (7 October 2004 – 30 November 2013)
John Leong Chi-yan, SBS, JP (1 December 2013 – 30 November 2019)
Henry Fan Hung-ling, SBS, JP (1 December 2019 – present)

Current and former chief executives
Yeoh Eng-kiong, OBE, JP (January 1994 – September 1999)
William Ho Shiu-wei, JP (20 September 1999 – 19 September 2005)
Ko Wing-man, JP (acting, 24 March 2003 – )
Vivian Wong Taam Chi-woon, JP (acting, 20 September 2005 – 28 February 2006)
Shane Solomon (1 March 2006 – 23 July 2010)
Leung Pak-yin, JP (8 November 2010 – 31 July 2019)
Ko Pat-sing, Tony (1 August 2019 - )

Board Committees
To perform its roles and exercise its powers, the board has established 11 functional committees:
Audit and Risk Committee
Emergency Executive Committee
Executive Committee
Finance Committee
Human Resources Committee
Information Technology Services Governing Committee
Main Tender Board
Medical Services Development Committee
Public Complaints Committee
Staff Appeals Committee, and
Supporting Services Development Committee.

Hospital Governing Committees
To enhance community participation and governance of public hospitals, the authority has established 31 Hospital Governing Committees in 38 hospitals and institutions. These committees received regular management reports from the hospital chief executives, monitored operational and financial performance of the hospitals, participated in human resources and procurement functions, as well as hospital and community partnership activities.

Regional Advisory Committees
To provide the authority with advice on the healthcare needs for specific regions of Hong Kong, the authority has established three Regional Advisory Committees. Each of the committees meets four times a year.

Funding
The authority is funded primarily by Hong Kong Government subvention, which amounted to HK$42.5 billion for 2012–2013, equating to over 90% of the authority's total income. Its other incomes include hospital and clinic fees and charges, donations, and investment.

The authority's total expenditure was HK$46.1 billion for 2012–2013, with 70% used to pay staff, and 14% to pay for drugs and other supplies.

Controversies

2003 SARS outbreak

In 2003, Hong Kong suffered from the outbreak of SARS and recorded considerable number of patients and casualties. The slow and delayed response of Hospital Authority was criticized. Believing that Hong Kong was safe from infectious diseases, the HA had inadequate preparation for facilities like isolated wards and single rooms that are important for the treatment of highly contagious diseases. In the early phase of the outbreak, public hospitals placed SARS patients in non-quarantined rooms that severely increased the chance of infection.

2008 milk contamination 
On the day when a Hong Kong girl was diagnosed as the territory's first victim of the 2008 Chinese milk scandal, anxious parents were frustrated to discover that doctors at the special unit set up at the Princess Margaret Hospital were taking the day off. Deputy Director of Health Gloria Tam said that it was "not something so urgent that it needs to be dealt with in 24 hours... They can go during office hours tomorrow". Medical sector legislator Leung Ka-lau said the lack of daily cover during the crisis was "insensitive".  While the first victim left hospital after successful treatment one day later, two more children were admitted to hospital on 22 September;  the Hospital Authority was reportedly overwhelmed when over 100 parents demanding check-ups for their children at Princess Margaret amids confusion about referrals and registration procedures, causing Secretary for Food and Health, York Chow to grovel for having underestimated the problem. Chow pledged 18 additional facilities around Hong Kong would be operational the next day.

Waiting times
Waiting time for elective treatment is quite high. The average waiting time for cataract surgery in 2014 was 22 months.

Chinese medicine and COVID-19 
In September 2022, Henry Fan Hung Ling, chairman of the Hospital Authority, lobbied for a "significant expansion" of traditional Chinese medicine used in Hong Kong's public healthcare. Days later, the Hospital Authority released information from a study it conducted, showing that traditional Chinese medicine could be used to cure long COVID. Rowena Wong Hau-wan, the Hospital Authority's chief manager (Chinese medicine), said "The research has served as evidence on treatment of Covid residual symptoms with Chinese medicine." However, Professor Bian Zhaoxian admitted that the patients could have recovered naturally rather than because of the Chinese medicine, and that the study was not conducted using a scientific randomized controlled trial.

COVID-19 and public hospitals 
On 27 August 2022, Health Secretary Lo Chung-mau suggested that private hospitals were slacking and could be punished for not taking in non-COVID patients from public hospitals due to potential overcrowding at public hospitals, though Dr. Siddharth Sridhar of HKU said that the overcrowding was because elderly patients with COVID-19 were often sent to public hospitals even if the severity of their symptoms was low. Months later in November 2022, Lau Ka-hin of the Hospital Authority said that public hospitals would be allowed to have COVID-19 positive patients with low symptoms to isolate at home instead of being treated at the hospital. Lau said that 60% of accident and emergency patients were taken in solely because of their COVID-19 positive result.

See also
Health in Hong Kong
List of hospitals in Hong Kong
Fung Hong
Health informatics

References

External links

 
Hospital Authority
1990 establishments in Hong Kong
Organizations established in 1990